C.I.D Moosa is a 2003 Indian Malayalam-language slapstick comedy action film directed by Johny Antony, written by Udaykrishna–Sibi K. Thomas duo, and co-produced by Dileep. It stars Dileep in the title role of a private detective, and also features Bhavana, Murali, Ashish Vidyarthi (in his Malayalam debut), Harisree Ashokan, Cochin Haneefa, Jagathy Sreekumar, Captain Raju, Oduvil Unnikrishnan, and Salim Kumar. In the film, C.I.D Moosa, a private detective, faces many challenges while solving various cases. His only rival is his own brother-in-law, Peethambaran, who is a police officer.

The film was released on 4 July 2003. It was a box office success, becoming the second highest-grossing Malayalam film of the year, behind Balettan. The film is known for its slapstick comedy and has developed a cult following. C.I.D Moosa was remade in Tamil as Cheena Thaana 001, in Kannada as CID Eesha and in Telugu as Ramachari.

Plot
Moolamkuzhiyil Sahadevan is the son of a police constable named Moolamkuzhiyil Prabhakaran, who works in the local police department's dog squad; even their dog Arjun is a trained member of the squad with a unique ability to nab culprits and deduce a crime scene. Sahadevan has only one ambition: to join the Kerala Police department for which he clears his exams and prepares for the physical test. However, Sahadevan is not in good terms with his brother-in-law Pitambaran (who too is a sub inspector) since the latter married Sahadevan's elder sister after an elopement.

Meanwhile, a terrorist mastermind named Khalid Muhammed Baba, who is incarcerated in the Tihar Jail, formulates a plot to murder the Kerala Chief Minister Ravi Menon with the help of the shrewd and cunning Police Commissioner Gowrishankar. It was later revealed that Menon previously served as the Minister for Home Affairs who ordered for the quelling of Baba's terrorist organization, which led to Baba's imprisonment and the slaying of his family. Baba and Shankar arranged several of their terrorists to implant a time bomb inside the hospital where Menon is undergoing treatment, but Sahadevan and Arjun find the bomb and throws it out before it explodes, though Arjun ends up being injured. Despite this, Sahadevan is able to arrange medical treatments to restore Arjun back to full health.

In response to Sahadevan's heroics for saving the hospital, Commissioner Gowrishankar (with the help from Pitambaran) intentionally makes Sahadevan fail his physical test. When Sahadevan finds out who the terrorists are, He tries to find a way to foil it by becoming a private detective and through taking over the security agency run by his uncle Karunan Chanthakkavala (aka Karamchand) and adopts the pseudonym CID Moosa. In his first assignment, Moosa and his associates manage to nab the first terrorist Randheer (who planted the bomb at the hospital) and surrender him over to the police, impressing the DIG Sathyanath (who happens to be Menon's nephew).

However, the commissioner secretly murders Randheer and destroys Moosa's office after learning that the firm doesn't have a license. The terrorists then plant another bomb on Menon's car in another attempt to kill him, but this was foiled when Moosa tries to meet Menon to file a complaint about the office ransacking, saving Menon from being killed by the explosion and leading Moosa to receive more praise by the public. Upon hearing what has happened, Baba furiously breaks out of prison as he personally intends to help the commissioner and the terrorists finish both Menon and Moosa themselves. Moosa later finds another terrorist named Amar, recognizing him as the one who tried to free Randheer from custody.

With that in mind, Moosa tries to nab Amar, but accidentally kills him by shooting him in the head (as he was told by Sathyanath only to shoot below the knee or he would face criminal charges). However, Sathyanath learns that the Central government issued a reward of  5 lakhs for Amar's head which Moosa will receive, much to the commissioner's distraught. In the meantime, Moosa falls in love with a young woman named Meena, who informed him that both Randheer and Amar along with another person named Jandu were paying guests in her apartment, and that she filed a complaint to the commissioner. However, upon being told by Moosa that they were terrorists, Meena realized in horror as she ends up being arrested by the commissioner under the false charges of harboring terrorists.

Moosa tries to plead for Meena's innocence to the commissioner by stating that she was unaware of the terrorists' identities, but he refuses and takes Meena into custody. As the commissioner has Meena tortured, he tries to molest her, but Moosa arrives to the rescue by thrashing him before releasing Meena, who reciprocates her feelings to Moosa in return. Because of this, the commissioner issues an arrest warrant on Moosa approved by a reluctant Menon. In Menon's house, Moosa sneaks in to plead his innocence to Menon, who unsurprisingly states that he already knows it by admitting that he witnessed Baba walking on the road on his way home.

As Menon explains to Moosa about Baba's backstory, the latter arrives by shooting Menon in the arm, forcing Moosa to shoot back to drive him away. Realizing that Baba and the commissioner are in cahoots with each other, Moosa drives Menon to safety in his car with Arjun. Using the devices on his car, Moosa is able to evade the cops pursuing him. However, Baba and the commissioner intercept them, and as just Baba is about to finish Moosa, he uses his wits to save Menon and Arjun by shooting both Baba and the commissioner to death. With his name cleared, Moosa is declared a hero by the citizens and authorities for foiling Baba's plot. He and Arjun are sent to Scotland Yard for advanced professional training. Before leaving, Moosa bids farewell to his family, friends and associates (even Sathyanath and Pitambaran paid their respect by waving goodbye to him), but at the end, Moosa's Private Jet is hijacked by the lunatic man who disturbs Moosa during his missions, the lunatic man hostaged the pilot and drive the Jet in an uncontrolled manner, which give lead that the film will have a sequel.

Cast

 Dileep as Moolamkuzhiyil Sahadevan / C.I.D. Moosa
 Bhavana as Meena
 Ashish Vidyarthi as Gauri Shankar, the Commissioner of Police
 Murali as Ravi Menon, the Chief Minister of Kerala 
 Jagathy Sreekumar as SI Peethambaran, Sahadevan's brother-in-law
 Harisree Asokan as 'Thorappan' Kochunni
 Cochin Haneefa as Moolamkoozhiyil Vikraman, Sahadevan's cousin
 Sharat Saxena as Khalid Mohammad Baba, a terrorist mastermind and the main antagonist
 Captain Raju as Karunan Chanthakkavala / Detective Karamchand
 Salim Kumar as The Insane Man
 Oduvil Unnikrishnan as Moolamkuzhiyil Prabhakaran, Sahadevan's father
 Sukumari as Sahadevan's mother
 Paravoor Bharathan as Meena's grandfather
 Subbalakshmi as Meena's grandmother
 Indrans as Theekkanal Varkey
 Bindu Panicker as Ramani, Peethambaran's wife and Sahadevan's sister
 Vijayaraghavan as Sathyanathan, the Deputy Inspector General of police
 Kunchan as Doctor Santhosh Pillai
 Machan Varghese as Stephen, Policeman
 Geetha Salam as Ashokan, Kochunni's father
 Abu Salim as CI George
 Narayanankutty as Kunjachan, Policeman
 Kalabhavan Shajohn as Hari, Police Constable
 Reena as Menon's wife
  Nandu Pothuval as Rajappan, Tailor
 Kalabhavan Haneef as Akhil, Broker
 Kalabhavan Rahman as Ramakrishnan
 Arjun Rex as Arjun, Sahadevan's dog
 Shweta Agarwal (Special Appearance in the song "James Bond")
 Kazan Khan as terrorist
 Sudheer Sukumaran as terrorist

Production
The title and character name was adopted from CID Moosa comics written and created by Kannadi Viswanathan.

Music
The film featured a soundtrack composed by Vidyasagar, with lyrics written by Gireesh Puthenchery.

Reception

Box office 
CID Moosa was a commercial success at the box office. The film was the second highest-grossing Malayalam film of that year, behind Balettan. It was made on a budget of 2.5 crore at a relatively higher budget for a Malayalam film at that time.

Critical response
The film is considered as one of the best slapstick comedy films in Malayalam, it has also achieved a cult fan following. In 2016, art house filmmaker Adoor Gopalakrishnan stated that his favourite film of Dileep is C.I.D. Moosa.

Remakes
Following the success of CID Moosa, it was remade in Tamil as Cheena Thaana 001 in 2007,  in Kannada as C. I. D. Eesha in 2013 and in Telugu as Ramachari in 2013.

Sequel
In 2016, it was revealed that a sequel is in development by the same team. But later on 28 October 2020, actor Dileep himself launched the promo of an animated series based on CID Moosa. The actor announced that a CID Moosa animation film will soon hit the screens after 17 years since its release.

References

External links 
 
 CID-Moosa

2000s Malayalam-language films
2003 films
Indian slapstick comedy films
Malayalam films remade in other languages
2000s crime comedy films
Indian crime comedy films
Films about organised crime in India
Films about terrorism in India
Fictional portrayals of the Kerala Police
Films shot in Kochi
Films scored by Vidyasagar
Films with screenplays by Udayakrishna-Siby K. Thomas
Films directed by Johny Antony
2003 comedy films